Hiram Augustus Unruh (November 1, 1845 – December 16, 1916) was a Union Army soldier from Indiana who became a prominent businessman in California.

Biography
Hiram A. Unruh was born in Valparaiso, Indiana on November 1, 1845. During the Civil War, he joined the 20th Indiana Infantry Regiment. He was captured and held in Libby Prison. After being released on parole and then exchanged for a Confederate prisoner, he reenlisted with the 1st United States Marine Artillery Volunteers.

After the war, he studied telegraphy, and worked for Western Union, Wells Fargo, and for Central Pacific Railroad crews building telegraph lines in California. He married Jane Anne Dunn on October 10, 1868, and they had two sons.

Unruh was a friend and advisor to E. J. "Lucky" Baldwin, and began managing his business affairs in 1879. He became the executor of his substantial estate after Baldwin's death in 1909, making investments which earned large returns for his heirs.

Hiram A. Unruh died while returning from an automobile trip to Arcadia, California from Los Angeles. He is buried at Evergreen Cemetery.

References

1845 births
1916 deaths
Burials at Evergreen Cemetery, Los Angeles
Businesspeople from California
People of Indiana in the American Civil War
People from Valparaiso, Indiana
Union Army soldiers
19th-century American businesspeople